Fjarðabyggð is a municipality located in eastern Iceland, in the Eastern Region.

History
The municipality was formed in 1998 with the union of the former municipalities of Eskifjörður, Neskaupstaður and Reyðarfjörður. Austurbyggð, Fáskrúðsfjarðarhreppur and Mjóafjarðarhreppur were merged into Fjarðabyggð in 2006, and Breiðdalshreppur merged in 2018.

Geography
The municipality is composed by the following villages:

Twin towns – sister cities

Fjarðabyggð is twinned with:

 Esbjerg, Denmark
 Eskilstuna, Sweden
 Gravelines, France
 Jyväskylä, Finland
 Qeqqata, Greenland
 Stavanger, Norway
 Vágar, Faroe Islands

References

External links

Official website 
Visit Fjarðabyggð

Municipalities of Iceland